Sprinze Helfft Levy (1735–1804), was a Prussian banker.  

Levy took over the position of hoffaktoren or banker of the King of Prussia from her husband Salomon Moses Levy (Shlomo Chalfan) in 1775–1790.

References

1804 deaths
18th-century German businesswomen
18th-century German businesspeople
1735 births
18th-century German Jews
Court Jews
18th-century Prussian women